The Nicholas Carter House, near Hodgenville, Kentucky, was built during 1872 to 1875.  It was listed on the National Register of Historic Places in 1991.

It is located on Carter Brothers Rd. in Larue County, Kentucky.

It is a two-story, five-bay central passage plan house with a rear two-story ell, with elements of Italianate style.

References

National Register of Historic Places in LaRue County, Kentucky
Italianate architecture in Kentucky
Houses completed in 1872